Fiji competed at the 2011 Pacific Games in Nouméa, New Caledonia between August 27 and September 10, 2011. As of June 28, 2011 Fiji has listed 425 competitors.

Archery

Fiji has qualified 5 athletes.

Men
George Fong
Kavitesh Sharma 
Robert Elder

Women
Dameyanti Cook
Devika Cook

Athletics

Fiji has qualified 34 athletes.

Men
Eroni Cagi
Leslie Copeland -  Javelin Throw
X Guide
Beniamino Maravu -  4 × 100 m Relay,  4 × 400 m Relay
Isir Naikelekelevesi
Vara Naikelekelevesi
Lepani Naivalu
Ratutira Narara -  400m,  4 × 400 m Relay
Ranjesh Prakash -  100m Parasport Ambulant
Kolino Qarau
Solomoni Qisavola
Nikotimo Radiva
Roy Ravana -  4 × 100 m Relay,  400m Hurdles
Isikeli Rokowaqa -  4 × 400 m,  200m
Timoci Serevi
Jone Suka
Ratu Ban Tabakaucoro -  100m,  200m,  4 × 100 m Relay
Varasiko Tomeru
Niko Verekauta -  4 × 400 m Relay
Eugene Vollmer -  4 × 100 m Relay,  Triple Jump,  Long Jump
Isikeli Waqa -  High Jump

Women
Danielle Alakija -  4 × 400 m Relay
Ana Baleveicau
Sarote Fiu
Suliana Gusuivalu -  4 × 400 m Relay
Paulini Korowaqa -  100m,  200m,  4 × 100 m Relay,  4 × 400 m Relay
Sereima Liku
Litiana Miller -  4 × 100 m Relay
Mereseini Naidau -  5000m,  1500m
Anameli Navukitu
Soko Salaniqiqi -  Heptathlon
Sisilia Seavula -  4 × 100 m Relay,  100m
Miriama Senokonoko -  400m,  4 × 100 m Relay,  4 × 400 m Relay
Milika Tuivanuavou

Badminton

Fiji has qualified 9 athletes.

Men
Shivneil Chand -  Mixed Team Tournament,  Double Tournament
Leon Quintin Joseph Jang -  Mixed Team Tournament
Burty James Molia -  Mixed Team Tournament,  Double Tournament,  Mixed Double Tournament
Nilesh Krishn Lajendra

Women
Alissa Dean -  Mixed Team Tournament
Andra Whiteside -  Single Tournament,  Double Tournament,  Mixed Team Tournament,  Mixed Double Tournament
Danielle Whiteside -  Double Tournament,  Mixed Team Tournament
Carline Bentley
Aushia-Marie Kahele-Keli

Baseball

Fiji has qualified a team.  Each team can have a maximum of 20 athletes.

Men
Rupeni Batai
Sanail Colainma
Noa Delaivuna
Emosi Gotegote
Joeli McGoon
Inoke Niubalavu
Abhiyendra Pratap
Joeli Saulekalekka
Tavo Sorovakatini
Thomas Gibbons
Peniseni Sivo
Alton Tamanitoakula

Basketball

Fiji has qualified a men's and women's team.  Each team can consist of a maximum of 12 athletes.

Men
Isikeli Mara
Kolinio Buiboto Matalau
Sakiusa Nakalevu
Ratu Tevita Saketa
Johnny Eki Seruvatu
Jese Sikivou
Tu'i  Leifanau Sikivou
Neal Tudreu
Jared Whippy
Leonard Everett Whippy
Waymann Whippy

Women -  Team Tournament
Ada Dansey
Seini Dobui
Vika Fifita
Brittany Hazelman 
Leba Korovou
Makilita Koyamainavure
Mareta Mani
Elenoa Naivalurua
Amalaini Raluvenitoga
Letava Whippy
Dale Marilyn Wise
Eileen Puamau

Bodybuilding

Fiji has qualified 3 athletes.

Men
Voniriti Radua -  -100 kg
Onisivoro Koroi
Paul Valentine

Boxing

Fiji has qualified 3 athletes.

Men
Pauliasi Ratu
Jese Ravudi -  -64 kg
Viliama Vutikalulu

Canoeing

Fiji has qualified 18 athletes.

Men
Tchun Chee Johnny Chung
Suliasi Delai
Serge Khan
Stanley Ooms
Jone Salusalu
Dylan Edwards
Bradley Campbell
Philp Mow
Rigamoto Taito

Women
Maryann Ma'Afu
Natalia Evans -  V1 500m,  V6 1500m
Pauline Benson -  V1 10 km,  V6 1500m
Courtney Pene -  V6 1500m
Kimberly Samson -  V6 1500m
Mei Tuicolo -  V6 1500m
Selita Koroi -  V6 1500m
Ellen Joyce
Salome Tabuatalei

Cricket

Fiji has qualified a team.  Each team can consist of a maximum of 15 athletes.

Men -  Team Tournament
Josefa Rika
Maciu Gauna
Mesui Talebula
Rukesh Patel
Omid Saberi
Peni Rika
Jikoi Kida
Sakaraia Lomani
Lee Waqa
Eric Browne
Viliame Yabaki
Sekove Ravoka
Seru Tupou

Football

Fiji has qualified a men's and women's team.  Each team can consist of a maximum of 21 athletes.

Men
Simione Tamanisau
Avinesh Suwamy
Lorima Dau
Seveci Rokotakala
Pene Erenio
Jone Vesikula
Pita Bolatoga
Alvin Singh
Malakai Tiwa
Tuimasi Manuca
Roy Krishna
Alvin Avinesh
Maciu Samaidrawa Dunadamu
Taniela Waqa
Archie Watkins
Ilaitia Tuilau
Malakai Kainihewe
Esava Naqeleca
Akuila Mateisuva
Beniamino Mateinaqara

Women -  Team Tournament
Matelita Vuakoso
Raijieli Lewasoqevula
Salote Yaya
Laijipa Daini
Joyce Naceva
Stella Naivalulevu
Bela Ratubalavu
Maria Lewavuni
Vanisha Kumar
Viniana Riwai
Sofi Diyalowai
Priya Singh
Lota Francis
Koleta Boraqa
Kini Ravai
Ane Maria
Renee Biautubu
Naomi Waqanidrola
Marica Ratuki
Kolora Sucu

Golf

Fiji has qualified 8 athletes.

Men
Olaf Allen
Anuresh Chandra
Vikrant Chandra
Roneel Prakash

Women
Sylvia Joe
Aseri Meikle
Gye Oh
Selai Pridgeon

Judo

Fiji has qualified 8 athletes.

Men
Josateki Naulu
Nemani Takayawa

Women
Elenoa  Korowaqa Navuasese
Elina Nasaudrodro
Mereseini Galu 
Usenia Nalu
Vani Kelekeleivalu
Sisilia Rasokisoki

Karate

Fiji has qualified 10 athletes.

Men
Beato Lenoa -  Team Kumite 
James Lenoa -  Team Kumite
Joji Veremalua -  -67 kg,  Team Kumite
David Qiolevu -  -75 kg,  Team Kumite
Pita Lenoa -  -84 kg,  Team Kumite
Anthony Yam -  Individual Kata
Victor Qiolevu -  Team Kumite

Women
Jasmine Rafiq -  Team Kata
Naomi Bakani -  -68 kg,  Individual Kata,  Team Kata,  Team Kumite
Adi Drodrolagi Kidia -  -61 kg,  Team Kata,  Team Kumite,  Open

Powerlifting

Fiji has qualified 12 athletes.

Men
Korio Vu Waqavakaviti -  -66 kg
Emosi Baleinuku -  -74 kg
Terence Taukave -  -83 kg
Jolame Rasovo -  -93 kg
Jioje Eric Hanfakaga

Women
Mozima Hussain -  -52 kg
Sainimere Abariga
Suliana Kolitagane -  -67 kg
Elesia Ikanidrodro -  -84 kg
Ana Garnett
Senimili Turner -  84 kg & Over
Helen Pahulu

Rugby Sevens

Fiji has qualified a men's and women's team.  Each team can consist of a maximum of 12 athletes.

Men -  Team Tournament
Ratu Dale Mataluvu
Setefano Cakaunivalu
Watisoni Votu
Lepani Veivuke
Mitieli Namisi
Nikola Matawalu
Metuisela Talebulamaijaina
Livai Koroigasagasa
Joeli Lutumailagi
Sevuloni Lutu
Aporosa Tabulawaki
Joji Ragamate

Women -  Team Tournament
Siteri Rasousou
Mereoni Yabakidrau
Pricilla Siata
Rusila Tamoi
Adi Tokasa Raikoso
Rusila Nagasau
Mereani Moce
Titilia Ravono
Ana Roqica
Elina Ratauluva
Adi Asenaca Tuena
Luisa Uluilakeba

Sailing

Fiji has qualified 8 athletes.

Shayne Brodie -  Mixed Hobie Cat Team,  Mixed Hobie Cat
Michael Chan
Robert Hazelman 
John Philp -  Mixed Hobie Cat Team
Taleilisi Brodie -  Mixed Hobie Cat Team,  Mixed Hobie Cat
Sulueti Rauqeuqe
Laisa Rauqeuqe
Charlotte Mara Dugdale -  Mixed Hobie Cat Team

Shooting

Fiji has qualified 3 athletes.

Men
Jerad Frost -  Single Barrel Team,  Double Barrel Team,  Point Score Team,  Single Barrel Individual
Glenn Kable -  Single Barrel Individual,  Single Barrel Team,  Double Barrel Individual,  Double Barrel Team,  Point Score Individual,  Point Score Team
Christian Stephen -  Single Barrel Team,  Double Barrel Team,  Point Score Team,  Point Score Individual

Squash

Fiji has qualified 7 athletes.

Men
Warren Yee -  Team Tournament,  Single Tournament,  Mixed Double Tournament
Marika Serevi Matanatabu -  Team Tournament
Justin Ho -  Single Tournament,  Team Tournament
Romit Parshottam -  Team Tournament
Sailesh Pala -  Team Tournament

Women
Janice Vivienne Chan
Sharmila Devi -  Mixed Double Tournament

Surfing

Fiji has qualified 6 athletes.

Men
Ian Muller -  Mixed Longboard
Isei Tokovou
Pauliasi Chong Sue  
Ratu Aca Lalabalavu -  Surf

Women
Kimberley Bennett -  Ondine
Kaye Lepper

Swimming

Fiji has qualified 11 athletes.

Men
William Clark -  4 × 100 m Freestyle Relay
Paul Elaisa -  200m Backstroke,  200m IM,  4 × 100 m Freestyle Relay,  4 × 200 m Freestyle Relay
Douglas Miller -  4 × 100 m Freestyle Relay,  4 × 200 m Freestyle Relay
Carl Probert -  4 × 100 m Freestyle Relay,  4 × 200 m Freestyle Relay
Elaijie Erasito -  4 × 200 m Freestyle Relay

Women
Matelita Buadromo -  4 × 200 m Freestyle Relay,  4x100 Medley Relay,  200m Freestyle,  50m Breaststroke,  100m Breaststroke,  200m Breaststroke
Skye Eden -  4 × 100 m Freestyle Relay,  4 × 200 m Freestyle Relay,  4 × 100 m Medley Relay,  200m IM
Susau Elaisa -  4 × 100 m Freestyle Relay,  4 × 200 m Freestyle Relay,  400m IM,  5 km Open Water
Tieri Erasito -  200m Butterfly,  4 × 200 m Freestyle Relay,  4 × 100 m Medley Relay,  400m Freestyle,  800m Freestyle,  100m Butterfly
Adele Rova -  4 × 100 m Freestyle Relay
Cheyenne Rova -  4 × 100 m Freestyle Relay,  4 × 100 m Medley Relay

Table Tennis

Fiji has qualified 8 athletes.

Men
Richel Sen -  Doubles Tournament,  Team Tournament
Qi Wang -  Doubles Tournament,  Team Tournament
Sanesh Chand -  Team Tournament
Christopher Guttersberger -  Team Tournament

Women
Venetia Koi
Xuan Li
Leighann Antonio
Tanya Guttersberger

Taekwondo

Fiji has qualified 3 athletes.

Men
Pranit Kumar -  -87 kg
Sameer Ali -  -58 kg
Vileen Shandil

Tennis

Fiji has qualified 8 athletes.

Men
Daneric Hazelman
William O'Connell
Christopher Lee Hargrove
Timoci Fa

Women
Annie Shannon
Tarani Kamoe
Adi Mere Fa
Losana Vosa

Triathlon

Fiji has qualified 1 athlete.

Women
Seini Adivuti

Volleyball

Beach Volleyball

Fiji has qualified a men's and women's team.  Each team can consist of a maximum of 2 members.

Men -  Team Tournament
Aisake Balemaiamerika
Ratu Wesele Cawanikawai

Women
Mereoni Lewesi
Lavenia Lewatuitovo

Indoor Volleyball

Fiji has qualified a men's and women's team.  Each team can consist of a maximum of 12 members.

Men
Matuisela Motu
Uraia Vakacegu Gadai
Manasa Baleilabasa
Temipale Fong
Inia Korowale
Nacanieli Elliot
Sebastian Yalani
Carlos Yalani
Sakiusa Boletawa
Maika Qiolevu
Joseva Ligaqaqa
Samu Vasuinadi

Women
Anaseini Seniloli
Sereana Turova
Adi Rebeka Lasaqa
Claire Delai
Torika Nuku
Ulamila Karisitiana
Marcia Togayali
Timaima Lomani
Durivatu Delai
Masi Raituku
Laite Qoro
Talica Rawaro

Weightlifting

Fiji has qualified 15 athletes.

Men
Manueli Tulo -  -56 kg Clean & Jerk,  -56 kg Snatch,  -56 kg Total
Fuluna Tikodelaimakotu
Tawai Tevita
Paula Peniasi Taque -  -77 kg Clean & Jerk,  -77 kg Total,  -77 kg Snatch
Pauliasi Loco
Josefa Atekini Vueti
Bill Andrews
Charlie Lolohea
Mesake Raiviu

Women
Seruwaia Malani -  -48 kg Clean & Jerk,  -48 kg Total
Arieta Mudunavoce -  -53 kg Clean & Jerk,  -53 kg Snatch,  -53 kg Total
Maria Liku -  -58 kg Clean & Jerk,  -58 kg Snatch,  -58 kg Total
Julia Timi -  -63 kg Clean & Jerk
Apolonia Vaivai
Louise Lolohea

References

2011 in Fijian sport
Nations at the 2011 Pacific Games
Fiji at the Pacific Games